Zygmunt Kulawik (3 January 1921 – 1982) was a Polish footballer. He played in three matches for the Poland national football team from 1939 to 1947.

References

External links
 

1921 births
1982 deaths
Polish footballers
Poland international footballers
Place of birth missing
Association footballers not categorized by position